Murali Krishna is an Indian film director who has worked on Tamil language films. He is best known for making romantic films in the early 2000s, and gained acclaim for Paarvai Ondre Podhume (2001).

Career
Murali Krishna made his directorial debut with the romantic film Paarvai Ondre Podhume (2001) featuring Kunal and Monal and the success of the first film, prompted the trio to reunite for another film titled Pesadha Kannum Pesume (2002). The second film received negative reviews, with a  critic stating it was "one of the most insipid films" and that "there is nothing new about the story, presentation and even the acting of Kunal and Monal are disappointing". In 2002, he began production on a project titled Endrum Unnai Nesippen starring Karthik and Haripriya in the lead roles. The film eventually failed to materialise owing to Karthik's off-screen problems. His third film, Thirudiya Idhayathai (2005), was shot within seventeen days and featured Kunal in the lead role again with newcomers Rohan and Shubha Poonja.

He then worked on the romance film, Balam (2009) with a lead pair of newcomers, which opened to negative reviews. A critic from Rediff.com criticised the director for failing to make use of experienced artistes like Rahman, Suhasini and Santhanam in the film. Murali Krishna then worked as the director and music composer on a film titled Karvam and then on Thuttu featuring Aryan Rajesh and despite having an audio release function in April 2013, the films remain unreleased.

In 2015, Murali Krishna was revealed to be working on a project titled Mirantavan starring Prajin and Manochitra, a tale on blackmail featuring seven actresses.

Filmography

References

Living people
21st-century Indian film directors
Tamil film directors
Year of birth missing (living people)